Seminis is an American developer, grower and marketer of fruit and vegetable seeds.

Seminis may also refer to:
 Receptaculum seminis, an organ of the female reproductive tract in insects, some molluscs, oligochaeta worms and certain other invertebrates and vertebrates

See also 
 Semini (disambiguation)